Enrique Pedro Ballestrero Griffo (18 January 1905 –  11 October 1969) was a Uruguayan footballer who played as a goalkeeper.

He was a member of the Uruguay squad that won the 1930 FIFA World Cup. He played in all four matches of the tournament, including the final win against Argentina.

Honours

International
FIFA World Cup: 1930
South American Championship: 1935

Individual
1930 FIFA World Cup All-Star Team

References

1905 births
1930 FIFA World Cup players
1969 deaths
People from Colonia del Sacramento
Uruguayan footballers
Association football goalkeepers
Uruguay international footballers
FIFA World Cup-winning players
Uruguayan Primera División players
Miramar Misiones players
Rampla Juniors players
Peñarol players
Copa América-winning players